= MPV17 mitochondrial inner membrane protein like 2 =

Protein-coding gene in the species Homo sapiens

An Error has occurred retrieving Wikidata item for infobox

MPV17 mitochondrial inner membrane protein like 2 is a protein that in humans is encoded by the MPV17L2 gene.
